The 28th Ryder Cup Matches were held 22–24 September 1989 at The Belfry in Wishaw, Warwickshire, England, near Sutton Coldfield.

For only the second time, the competition ended in a draw at 14 points each, but the European team retained the Cup since they had won it outright in 1987. Europe held a two-point lead, 9 to 7, entering the singles matches on Sunday, and the match which retained the Cup for Europe was the eighth, between José María Cañizares and Ken Green. Cañizares made a two-foot (0.6 m) putt on the 18th green to win 1 up and give Europe a 14–10 lead, with four matches remaining on the course. The final four matches all resulted in U.S. wins and an overall draw.

This was the first Ryder Cup played in Europe to be televised live in the United States. It was carried by the USA Network on cable, with video provided by the BBC.
The U.S. television coverage in 1985 was a highlight show on ESPN in early November, over a month after its completion. NBC Sports took over live weekend coverage in 1991 in South Carolina, and 1993 marked the first time a major U.S. network televised it live from Europe.

Format
The Ryder Cup is a match play event, with each match worth one point.  The competition format in 1989 was as follows:
Day 1 (Friday) — 4 foursome (alternate shot) matches in a morning session and 4 four-ball (better ball) matches in an afternoon session
Day 2 (Saturday) — 4 foursome matches in a morning session and 4 four-ball matches in an afternoon session
Day 3 (Sunday) — 12 singles matches
With a total of 28 points, 14 points were required to win the Cup, and 14 points were required for the defending champion to retain the Cup.  All matches were played to a maximum of 18 holes.

Teams
The selection process for the European team remained the same as used in 1985 and 1987, with nine players chosen from the 1989 European Tour money list at the conclusion of the German Open on 27 August and the remaining three team members being chosen immediately afterwards by the team captain, Tony Jacklin. Prior to the final event Philip Walton was in the 9th qualifying place with Cañizares in 10th. Cañizares finished joint fifth in the German Open and took the final qualifying place with Walton dropping to 11th place behind Bernhard Langer who finished in 10th. Jacklin's choices were Langer, Christy O'Connor Jnr and Howard Clark. 1988 Masters winner Sandy Lyle had previously told Jacklin that he did not wish to be considered for selection.

Captains picks are shown in yellow. The world rankings and records are at the start of the 1989 Ryder Cup.

Captains picks are shown in yellow. The world rankings and records are at the start of the 1989 Ryder Cup.

Friday's matches

Morning foursomes

Afternoon four-ball

Saturday's matches

Morning foursomes

Afternoon four-ball

Sunday's singles matches

Individual player records
Each entry refers to the win–loss–half record of the player.

Source:

Europe

United States

References

External links
PGA of America: 1989 Ryder Cup
GolfCompendium.com: 1989 Ryder Cup

Ryder Cup
Golf tournaments in England
Sport in Warwickshire
Ryder Cup
Ryder Cup
Ryder Cup